Deinandra martirensis is a rare North American species of plants in the tribe Madieae within the family Asteraceae.

Deinandra martirensis has is native to the Peninsula of Baja California in northwestern Mexico. The species has been found in both of the states on the peninsula, the northern state called Baja California, and the southern state named Baja California Sur.

References

martirensis
Flora of Baja California
Flora of Baja California Sur
Plants described in 1935